Eden Valley wine region is a wine region located in South Australia immediately north of the capital city of Adelaide which covers an area in the Mount Lofty Ranges extending from Truro in the north to just south of Springton in the south.  The region received appellation as an Australian Geographical Indication in 1997 and as of 2014, it is represented by at least 36 wineries.

Extent and appellation
Eden Valley wine region covers an area in the Mount Lofty Ranges extending from Truro in the north to just south of Springton in the south.  The region is bordered by the Barossa Valley wine region to the west and by the Adelaide Hills wine region to the south.  
The Eden Valley wine region was registered as an Australian Geographical Indication on 15 August 1997.
The Eden Valley wine region includes a sub-region called High Eden.

Grapes and wine
Alternatively, red wine varietals account for of plantings while white wines varietals account for of plantings.  
The 2014 vintage is reported as consisting of  red grapes crushed valued at A$4,897,755 and  white grapes crushed valued at $4,215,543.  
As of 2014, the region is reported as containing at least 36 wineries.

See also

South Australian wine
List of wineries in the Eden Valley

Citations and references

Citations

References

External links
 Eden Valley Wine Region South Australian Tourism Bureau webpage 

Wine regions of South Australia